Wong Tin-Lam (1927–2010) was a Chinese screenwriter, producer, director, and actor, who has contributed to the Hong Kong cinema scene with a career spanning six decades. He has made films in Cantonese, Mandarin and Amoy dialect.

Career
Wong began as a film director in the mid-1950s, working for the Hsin Hwa Motion Picture Company (renamed to Xinhua Film Company in 1957).

Wong later joined Cathay Organisation. When Cathay Studios was shut down in the early 1970s, Wong continued to establish himself as a filmmaker, making TV drama serials by combining film production techniques with the flexibility of television production, and became a trendsetter in melodrama and wuxia serials.

Wong retired from the television production scene, and in his later career could be seen in appearances and supporting roles in films directed by Johnnie To, Wai Ka-Fai and his son, Wong Jing, who has followed in his footsteps.

Filmography 
This is a partial list of films.
 1953 The Film World's Merry Song (aka Stand Up and Cheer, The Very Best from Show Biz) - Director.
 1962 It's Always Spring - Record company manager.

References

External links

 Wong Tin-Lam at hkmdb.com

Hong Kong male film actors
Hong Kong film producers
Hong Kong screenwriters
Chinese film producers
1927 births
2010 deaths
Male actors from Shanghai
Screenwriters from Shanghai
Hong Kong male television actors
20th-century Hong Kong male actors
Film directors from Shanghai